The Guam Women's National Sevens Rugby Union Team is Guam's national representative in Rugby sevens. In 2016, they participated in the 2016 Asia Rugby Women's Sevens Series and placed seventh overall. Guam also attended the Asia Rugby Women’s Sevens Trophy tournament in Seria, Brunei in 2018.

They competed at the 2019 Asia Rugby Women's Sevens Series and finished fifth in the Sevens Trophy division.

Players

Previous squads
Squad at 2019 Asia Rugby Women's Sevens Trophy: 
Rosae Calvo (CoCap)
Olivia Elliott (CoCap)
Patrisha Manlulu
Hazel Ochavillo
Nikkie Paulino
Tori Starr
Paige Surber
Kayla Taguacta
Kimberly Taguacta
Vana Terlaje
Vina Terlaje

Tournament History

Pacific Games

See also
Rugby union in Guam

References

Women's national rugby sevens teams
National sports teams of Guam
Rugby union in Guam